FV105 Sultan is a British Army command and control vehicle based on the CVR(T) platform. It has a higher roof than the armoured personnel carrier variants, providing a more comfortable "office space" inside.

Design
The Sultan contains a large vertical map board and desk along one side, with a bench seat for three people facing it. Forward of this are positions for the radio operator, with provision for four radios, and vehicle commander, whose seat can be raised to give him access to the pintle-mounted general purpose machine gun. The driver sits forward of this in a small compartment beside the engine space, on a chair with a spring-loaded seat that allows him to recline inside the vehicle or sit upright with his head out of the hatch.

The back of the vehicle is designed to be extended by an attached tent to form a briefing area. The map board can be removed from the vehicle and hung from the tent poles, along with overhead lights connected to the Sultan's power supply. However, this option has been removed from many vehicles in service.

In common with the other CVR(T) vehicles, the Sultan was originally fitted with a canvas skirt for river crossing. Because of its high roof, this was needed only at the front, which slopes downwards. The swimming skirt has been permanently removed from all CVR(T) vehicles in the British Army.

The Sultan contains an NBC filter pack for protection against chemical gas, biological agents and radioactive particles.

Operators

Current operators

References

External links
East of England Tank Museum

Command vehicles
Cold War armoured fighting vehicles of the United Kingdom
Armoured personnel carriers of the Cold War